The 2016 Tashkent Challenger was a professional tennis tournament played on hard courts. It was the ninth edition of the tournament, which was part of the 2016 ATP Challenger Tour. It took place in Tashkent, Uzbekistan between 12 and 17 October 2016.

Singles main-draw entrants

Seeds

 1 Rankings are as of October 3, 2016.

Other entrants
The following players received wildcards into the singles main draw:
  Sanjar Fayziev
  Jurabek Karimov
  Shonigmatjon Shofayziyev
  Khumoun Sultanov

The following players received entry from the qualifying draw:
  Ivan Dodig 
  Mikhail Elgin 
  Alexander Vasilenko
  Anton Zaitcev

Champions

Singles

  Konstantin Kravchuk def.  Denis Istomin, 7–5, 6–4.

Doubles

  Mikhail Elgin /  Denis Istomin def.  Andre Begemann /  Leander Paes, 6–4, 6–2.

References

External links
Official Website

Tashkent Challenger
Tashkent Challenger